WPVM fm 103.7  (103.7 FM) is a non-commercial FM radio station licensed in Asheville, North Carolina. In 2015, after a decade of internal conflicts and financial struggles, the station's license was transferred to a new organization, Friends of WPVM.

History
The MAIN construction permit was issued by the Federal Communications Commission (FCC) on December 30, 2002. The station's first broadcast was in October 2003 under a Low Power FM Class 1 license for 100 watts effective radiated power (ERP). After years of financial problems, the station became dormant in 2011—2014. MAIN's board of directors subsequently voted to divest of WPVM to a newly-formed non-profit, Friends of WPVM, in October 2014. One of MAIN's directors attempted to prevent the transfer. There were several other allegations made against several parties during the dispute, one of which resulted in a $500,000 defamation suit against one board member.  Despite the controversy that ensued, the FCC approved the license transfer on May 8, 2015.

After acquiring the license, Friends of WPVM's board,  began a concerted effort to remedy the station's financial problems and replace its outdated equipment. As part of the group's improvements, the station moved from an apartment building to new quarters in the Self-Help Building in downtown Asheville.

References

External links
 WPVM-LP website
 

PVM-LP
PVM-LP
Talk radio stations in the United States
Community radio stations in the United States
Radio stations established in 2004
2004 establishments in North Carolina